Iraklio OAA B.C. (Greek: Ηράκλειο OAA KAE), also known simply as Iraklio, or Heraklion, is a Greek professional basketball club that is based in the city of Heraklion, on the island of Crete, in Greece. It is a department of the Heraklion Tennis and Team Sports Club (Greek: Όμιλος Αντισφαιρίσεως και Αθλοπαιδιών - OAA - «Ηράκλειο»), a multi-sport club established in Heraklion in 1928. The club's basketball department was founded in 1968, and currently competes in the Cretan Basket League, hosting its home games at the Heraklion Indoor Sports Arena, a multi-purpose indoor arena with a capacity of 5,500 spectators. Irakleio is considered the most successful basketball club in Heraklion, being the sole club to have represented the city in the top-tier Greek Basket League, as well as the most successful club on the island of Crete, at least until the rise of the Rethymno Cretan Kings in the early 2010s. Iraklio OAA further administers competitive departments for tennis, table tennis and chess.

History

Creation
Iraklio OAA was established in 1928, primarily operating as a tennis club. In 1968, under president Giorgos Deligiannakis, the club decided to expand its activities thus founding team sports departments for basketball and volleyball, reinstating its defunct table tennis department, as well as establishing competitive chess and bridge departments. The first coach of the basketball department was Michalis Dardantakis, who was replaced by Kostas Rigas shortly thereafter.

In 1973, Iraklio was promoted to the Greek B Basket League, where it kept playing for 5 straight seasons, until 1978, when it was relegated to the local Cretan Championship. After a dormant period spanning almost nine years, in which the club played in local competitions, an organized effort was made by newly appointed General Manager Manolis Papakaliatis to return to national competitions. Within just seven years, Iraklio achieved multiple promotions. In the 1993–94 season, the club competed in  the Greek A2 Basketball League for the first time in its history. The very next season, Iraklio finished 2nd in the league, thus managing promotion to the A1 Greek Basket League, the top tier of the Greek basketball league system, becoming the first Cretan club to achieve this feat.

1995–2003: Domestic success and European outings
Iraklio lived its glory days during the mid 90s, when the club was promoted to the A1 Greek Basket League. Despite being relegated in its inaugural season in the league, the club instantly returned to top-flight after winning the 1996–97 A2 Championship. The next season saw the club finishing in 8th place during regular season, thus clinging to a spot in the Greek basketball playoffs. They beat traditional Greek basketball powerhouse Aris in both games of their first round playoff series, thus finishing seventh overall in the league, which to this day still remains the best season performance in the history of the club. To accomplish this feat, Iraklio had one of the most impressive home records (13–2) at the end of the 1997–98 season, which propelled them towards their first ever European competition appearance. Iraklio consequently played in the 1998–99 FIBA Korać Cup, where they managed to reach the Round of 32. The club upheld a competitive profile throughout its next seasons in the Greek Basket League by managing to sign former NBA veterans into its rosters, most notably Oliver Miller (22nd overall pick in the 1992 NBA draft ) for the 1998–99 season and Willie Burton (9th overall pick in the 1990 NBA draft) in 1999–2000. Iraklio peaked its domestic performance during the 2002–03 season, notably managing to reach the Greek Basketball Cup Final Four (eventually placing in 4th place in the competition).

At the end of the 2003–04 season, Iraklio lost its place in the Greek Basket League finishing in 13th place, thus being relegated to the A2 Championship after seven consecutive seasons in top-flight. Throughout the season, Iraklio won only 7 games, six of which during the First Round, while going on a 13-game losing streak which spanned from 13 December 2003 to 2 May 2004. At the end of the season, the club tied in 12th place with Ionikos Nea Filadelfeia, both having 33 points on the Table, yet Iraklio was eventually relegated in head-to-head ranking (having lost to Ionikos 94−87 in overtime).

Arenas
Irakleio previously used the 1,500 seat Lido Indoor Hall as its home arena. It currently uses the 5,500 seat Heraklion Indoor Sports Arena as its home arena. The 2,400 seat TEI Indoor Sports Hall is also available for the club to use, if needed.

Titles and honors
Greek 2nd Division Champion (1):
1997

Roster

Notable players

Greece:
  Marios Batis
  Christos Charissis
  Georgios Gasparis
  Fotis Katsikaris
  John Korfas
  Nikos Liakopoulos
  Dimitris Lolas
  Christos Myriounis
  Alfa Ntiallo
  Pete Papachronis
  Argiris Papapetrou
  Ioannis Sioutis
  Vangelis Sklavos

Europe:
  Frederick Forte

Africa:
  Samir Gouda

USA:
  Willie Burton
  James Forrest
  Derrick Hamilton
  Antonio Harvey
  Oliver Miller
  Jimmy Oliver
  Richard Rellford
  Carl Thomas

Rest of Americas:
  Andrés Guibert
  José Piculín Ortiz

Head coaches
  Vangelis Alexandris

References

External links
Official website 
Eurobasket.com Team Profile

Basketball teams in Crete
Basketball teams in Heraklion